South of the Border is an album by the David Murray Big Band released on the Japanese DIW label. Recorded in 1992 and released in 1993 the album features performances by Murray, Rasul Siddik, James Zoller, Hugh Ragin, Craig Harris, Frank Lacy, Al Patterson, Vincent Chancey, Kalil Henry, John Purcell, Patience Higgins, Don Byron, Sonelius Smith, Fred Hopkins, Tani Tabbal, and Larry McDonald, conducted by Lawrence "Butch" Morris.

Reception
The Allmusic review awarded the album 3 stars.

Track listing
 "St. Thomas" (Rollins) – 6:35
 "Happy Birthday Wayne, Jr." (Francis) – 12:19
 "Awakening Ancestors" (Craig Harris) – 7:09
 "Calle Estrella" (Francis) 7:55
 "World Of The Children" (Smith) – 7:29
 "Fling" (Morris) – 6:18
 "Flowers For Albert" (Murray) – 10:44 
Recorded May 23, 24 & 25, 1992, NYC

Personnel
David Murray – tenor saxophone, bass clarinet
Rasul Siddik – trumpet
James Zoller – trumpet
Hugh Ragin – trumpet
Craig Harris – trombone
Frank Lacy – trombone
Al Patterson – trombone
Vincent Chancey – flugelhorn
Kalil Henry – flute
John Purcell – alto saxophone
Patience Higgins – tenor saxophone, soprano saxophone
Don Byron – clarinet, bassoon
Sonelius Smith – piano
Fred Hopkins – bass
Tani Tabbal – drums
Larry McDonald – percussion
Lawrence "Butch" Morris – conductor

References 

1993 albums
David Murray (saxophonist) albums
DIW Records albums